In American politics, the China lobby consisted of advocacy groups calling for American support for the Republic of China during the period from the 1930s until US recognition of the People's Republic of China in 1979, and then calling for closer ties with the PRC thereafter.

After 1945, the term "China lobby" was used most often to refer to groups favoring the Republic of China (ROC) on Taiwan in opposition to Mao Zedong's communist government in Beijing. They opposed the 1972 Nixon visit to mainland China, and the American recognition of the People's Republic of China (PRC) in 1979. The small Chinese American community largely shared a similar pro-ROC perspective.  Since that time, the support for Mainland China has greatly strengthened.

History

Cold War period

The Committee of One Million Against the Admission of Red China to the United Nations, later changed its name to The Committee of One Million Against the Admission of Communist China to the United Nations. The committee was established by Marvin Liebman, a political activist. Congressman Walter Judd (1898–1994) was an important spokesman for the Lobby. The China Lobby was funded by the Kuomintang through T. V. Soong, one of the wealthiest people in the world, brother-in-law of Chiang Kai-shek, the leader of the Republic of China (Taiwan).

It was the dominant lobby on China issues until the 1970s. During the 1970s, the China Lobby campaigned furiously to prevent American recognition of the People's Republic of China (PRC), but its efforts proved to be unsuccessful. Richard Nixon opened the door to mainland China in 1972 and the PRC was recognized by the United States in 1979.

Deng Xiaoping period

In 1979, the Taiwan Relations Act was signed by President Carter, which committed the United States to provide military and other support for Taiwan and provided guidelines for future trade and other relations.

In 1980, Chinese leader Deng Xiaoping launched the so-called "Reform and Opening" policies. Deng Xiaoping embarked on a major process of economic changes, and pressed the U.S. to open trade relations. One of the main aspects of this was opening the doors to international trade and business. China lobbied to gain business from the United States, and companies began to flock to China to take advantage of the new opportunities made possible by trade laws. China was invited to join the IMF and World Bank.

In 1982, after additional negotiations concerning coordinating positions regarding the Soviet Union and Taiwan, the United States and China released another joint communiqué, the Third Communiqué,  by which the United States agreed to reduce its arms sales to Taiwan and China agreed to emphasize a peaceful resolution of the Taiwan issue.  The next year, Deng Xiaoping proposed the "one country, two systems" approach for unification with both Hong Kong and Taiwan.

In 1986, China joined the Asian Development Bank and applied for membership in the General Agreement on Tariffs and Trade (GATT) and the World Trade Organization (WTO). The United States at the time did not support China's entry into the latter two organizations because of reservations about the degree of openness of China's economy.

In 1989, in the aftermath of the Chinese military crackdown on demonstrations in Beijing's Tiananmen Square in the spring, the United States and other nations imposed economic sanctions on China, and many U.S. citizens evacuated the country. President George H.W. Bush maintained communications with senior Chinese leaders, though tensions continued into the next year, with criticisms aired from both sides.  Diplomatic ties were never severed and China remained open to foreign trade.

Post-Deng Xiaoping period

In 1992, the first high-level contacts in several years occurred when President George H.W. Bush and Chinese Premier Li Peng met on the sidelines of a U.N. conference. President Bush maintained support for Taiwan by authorizing new arms sales and dispatching a Special Trade Representative to the island.

President Clinton had in 1993 tied the annual review of Most Favored Nation trading status to China's record on human rights, a decision that was in keeping with popular opinion on China. When this status came up for renewal the next year, Clinton reversed this position and granted China MFN without requiring any changes regarding human rights.

In 1998, President Bill Clinton agreed that the United States held to a "three no’s policy" regarding Taiwan. By this he meant that the United States does not support Taiwan's independence, "two Chinas" or "one China, one Taiwan" policies, or Taiwan's membership in international organizations where statehood is required.

Late in 1999 in the year, after lobbying by China, the two sides finally came to an agreement and China was able to join the WTO. The annual debate over China's trading status within the United States was ended when President Clinton decided to grant China permanent Normal Trade Relations (NTR, formerly MFN).

21st century

In the first decade of the twenty-first century, the PRC lobby has focused on playing up common interests with the United States in the War on Terrorism. The PRC lobby has also tried to counter the domestic American interest groups which seek to bring pressure upon the PRC to move from a fixed currency to a floating currency.

In 2004, the Ministry of Public Security (MPS) created a working group to look at new ways for outward immigration to benefit China, a policy that was first initiated in 1985. The group was tasked with balancing the need to promote economic development and protect national security and social stability. Seminars were organized to discuss Western immigration laws.

Neil Bush, son of George H. W. Bush (who had been instrumental in opening China to U.S. investment and bilateral trade as the Ambassador to the PRC) in 2011 incorporated an accounting firm called LehmanBush with veteran China lawyer Edward Lehman. In 2002, Bush signed a consulting contract that paid $2 million in stock over five years to work for Grace Semiconductor Manufacturing Corp., a firm backed by Jiang Mianheng, the son of former Communist Party General Secretary Jiang Zemin, plus $10,000 for every board meeting he attends.

By the late 2010s, mutual wariness between the Chinese and American governments over different views over international diplomacy, economics, and human rights issues began to eclipse previously supportive policies in the United States. As a part of this trend, American business leaders, concerned over both market access and business revenue, began facing dilemmas regarding closer scrutiny from American officials over the Foreign Agents Registration Act and lobbying requests from the Chinese government on American legislation that the Chinese government perceived as hostile. Consequentially, the U.S.-China Business Council and the United States of America-China Chamber of Commerce have gone relatively silent compared to previous years when China enjoyed widespread support within American political circles when it joined the WTO.

See also
Asia first
Chinese information operations and information warfare
China Hands
Committee of 100 (United States)
Blue Team (U.S. politics)
Africa–China relations
National Committee on United States–China Relations
China–United States relations

Notes

Further reading

 Bachrack, Stanley D. The Committee of One Million: "China Lobby" Politics, 1953-1971 [ New York: Columbia University Press, 1976) online.
 Blackwell, Jeff. "'The China Lobby': Influences on US-China Foreign Policy in the Post War Period, 1949-1954." The Forum: Journal of History 2#1 (2010) online.
 Crean, Jeffrey. "'Nixon is With Us on China':  Raging against the Dying of the Lobby"  Journal of American-East Asian Relations 26:4 (2019):  368–396.  DOI: https://doi.org/10.1163/18765610-02604003 online review of this article in H-DIPLO.
 Davis, Forrest, and Robert A. Hunter. The Red China Lobby.  (New York: Fleet, 1963).
 Erskine, Kristopher C. "American Public Diplomacy with Chinese Characteristics: The Genesis of the China Lobby in the United States, and how Missionaries Shifted American Foreign Policy between 1938 and 1941." Journal of American-East Asian Relations 25.1 (2018): 33–59.
 Hrebenar, Ronald J., and Clive S. Thomas. "The Rise and fall and rise of the China Lobby in the United States." in Interest Group Politics (CQ Press, 2011): 297+.
 Hung, Ho-fung. "The periphery in the making of globalization: the China Lobby and the Reversal of Clinton’s China Trade Policy, 1993–1994." Review of International Political Economy (2020): 1-24.
 Keeley, Joseph Charles. The China Lobby Man: The Story of Alfred Kohlberg. (New Rochelle, NY: Arlington House, 1969). online
 Koen, Ross Y., ed.  The China Lobby in American Politics. (1974) online.
 Mao, Joyce. " No Such Thing: The China Lobby." in Asia First (U of Chicago Press, 2015) pp. 44–77.
 Mao, Joyce. Asia First: China and the Making of Modern American Conservatism (U of Chicago Press, 2015). viii, 226 pp.
 Marshall, Jonathan. "Cooking the Books: The Federal Bureau of Narcotics, the China Lobby and Cold War Propaganda, 1950–1962." Asia-Pacific Journal: Japan Focus 11 (2013) online.
 Stueck Jr, William W. The Road to Confrontation: American Policy Toward China and Korea (UNC Press Books, 2017).
 Yin, Xiao-huang. "From the China Lobby to the Taiwan Lobby: Movers and Shakers of the US–China–Taiwan Triangular Relationship." in The Expanding Roles of Chinese Americans in US-China Relations: Transnational Networks and Trans-Pacific Interactions (Routledge, 2015) pp. 148–164.

Foreign relations of China
Political terminology of the United States
Foreign relations of Taiwan
China–United States relations
Conservatism in the United States